Pedro Felipe Felzenszwalb is a computer scientist and professor of the School of Engineering and Department of Computer Science at Brown University.

Career 
Felzenszwalb studied computer science at Cornell University, receiving his B.S. in 1999. There, he began researching computer vision and artificial intelligence with Daniel P. Huttenlocher. He earned his M.S. and Ph.D. degrees from the Massachusetts Institute of Technology in 2001 and 2003, respectively. He became a faculty member at the University of Chicago in 2004, and was made an associate professor in 2008. In 2010, he was awarded the Longuet-Higgins Prize for his work in the field of computer vision.

Felzenszwalb joined Brown University as an associate professor in the School of Engineering and Department of Computer Science in 2011. In 2013, he was awarded the Grace Murray Hopper Award by the Association for Computing Machinery for his contributions to the problem of object recognition in pictures and video. In 2014, he was awarded the Edward J. McCluskey Technical Achievement Award by the IEEE for his work with object recognition with deformable models.

In 2018, Felzenszwalb received the Longuet-Higgins Prize for fundamental contributions to computer vision a second time. In particular, this prize recognized his work with discriminately trained, multiscale, deformable part models. The prize was first awarded in 2005, and Felzenszwalb is among a select group of repeat winners.

Selected publications

References

External links
 Pedro Felipe Felzenszwalb on the Brown University website

Living people
American computer scientists
Cornell University alumni
MIT School of Engineering alumni
University of Chicago faculty
Brown University faculty
Grace Murray Hopper Award laureates
Year of birth missing (living people)